Río Cuarto is a city in the province of Córdoba, Argentina. Located in the south of the province, it has about 157,000 inhabitants and is an important commercial and agricultural hub.

Overview
The Río Cuarto River flows through the province of Córdoba; its central location in the Humid Pampas favored the city's development as a transport hub for much of the surrounding agriculture, and a number of slaughterhouses and food processing plants opened in Río Cuarto during the twentieth century.

Río Cuarto was founded on November 11, 1786, as Villa de la Concepción del Río Cuarto, by the colonial Governor Rafael de Sobremonte. Its first rail connection was by way of the former Andean Railway in 1870, after which the village grew rapidly with the influx of Italian and Spanish immigrants (mainly as tenant farmers). The municipal government charter establishing the modern system of elected mayors and city council was enacted in 1883; the city's first elected mayor was Moysés Irusta. 

Father Antonio Cardarelli commissioned the construction of the city's principal Roman Catholic church, the Cathedral of the Immaculate Conception, built between 1883 and 1886.
The National University of Río Cuarto, established in 1971, is located here. The city's football teams include Estudiantes and Atenas. Río Cuarto hosted the International Biology Olympiad in 2006.

The city is served by National Routes 8, 36, and 158; as well as Las Higueras Airport, inaugurated in 1954. The cable-stayed Bicentennial Bridge, was inaugurated in 2010. Some of the city's principal tourist draws include the Río Cuarto Racetrack, which hosts Turismo Carretera touring car racing events; and Estancia El Durazno, an estate built in 1917 belonging to former Governor Ambrosio Olmos. The Río Cuarto craters, a group of geologically unusual impact craters, are located nearby. The city's UN/LOCODE is ARRCU.

University of Río Cuarto

The National University of Río Cuarto was created on 1 May 1971 by a decree signed by President Alejandro Lanusse in accordance with the Taquini Plan enacted the previous year to provide greater access to university education in Argentina.

The University of Río Cuarto had an enrollment of 14,000 students in 2013, and employs 2,000 teaching staff. By its nature a multidisciplinary center in its scope a wide variety of activities, the university hosts frequent conferences, congresses, seminars, and graduate courses.

Through the operation of 42 graduate and fourth-level racing term (PhD, Masters and Professional), the university provides a diversified curriculum and contributes to the scientific and technical training, vocational training, scientific research, and development of cultural life.

Climate

The climate is temperate, typical of the humid Pampas, with four marked seasons. Summers are warm with frequent thunderstorms; however, the heat is often "cut" by periods of southerly winds, so that the average high is a comfortable 29 °C, despite the fact that it can reach 38 °C.

Fall arrives slowly in March, and winter arrives in May with the first frosts. During the very dry winters, temperatures vary according to wind patterns: northwesterly, downsloping winds can bring temperatures of 25 °C (but with cool nights) even in midwinter, whereas southerly winds can leave daytime highs around 6 °C. Temperatures descend to -5 °C sometimes, and snow is uncommon, but not extremely so: in 2007, over 15 cm of snow covered the city, and temperatures plummeted to -11 °C, reaching highs of only 0 °C on one occasion.

Spring brings violent thunderstorms and wide temperature swings, with heat waves followed by frost or cool periods. On some years, the normal winter drought extends into the spring, posing a threat to agriculture; however, at 846 mm, Rio Cuarto´s climate is generally favourable for crops.

Thunderstorm are very common during the summer, and can last for hours, and even days.

Transportation
Rio Cuarto is served by Las Higueras Airport with one commercial airline flying to it. Trains are mostly used throughout the city.

References

External links

 Municipality of Río Cuarto - Official website.
 
 University in Río Cuarto

Populated places in Córdoba Province, Argentina
Populated places established in 1786
Cities in Argentina
Córdoba Province, Argentina
Argentina